Stephanie Frank Singer is an American mathematician and local politician in Philadelphia, Pennsylvania. Early in her adulthood, Singer pursued a career in education as an assistant professor at Haverford College, serving from 1991 to 2002. She then went on to pursue careers in data science before going into politics, serving as city commissioner in Philadelphia.

Early life and education
Singer was born in 1964 to Maxine and Daniel Singer where she was raised in Washington, D.C.

Career

Academic 
Singer earned a Ph.D. in 1991 at New York University.
She is the author of two books:

Linearity, Symmetry, and Prediction in the Hydrogen Atom (Springer, Undergraduate Texts in Mathematics 115, 2005) 
Symmetry in Mechanics: A Gentle, Modern Introduction (Birkhauser Boston, 2001).
Additionally, she is the translator of a book by Yvette Kosmann-Schwarzbach, Groups and Symmetries: From Finite Groups to Lie Groups (Springer, 2010).

In a 2017 article in The Chronicle of Higher Education she discussed her experience as a victim of sexual harassment at Haverford College.

Politics 
Singer was elected Democratic Party committeeperson for Philadelphia's 8th Ward in 2008. In 2011, she was elected as a city commissioner, defeating 36-year incumbent Marge Tartaglione. Singer served one term as city commissioner from 2012 to 2015. In October, 2018, Singer launched a podcast entitled Defend Democracy! where she reflects on her experience as a former election official, data strategist, and successful candidate, with advice to those who have interests in entering politics.

References

External links
 Campaign Scientific 

1964 births
Living people
Pennsylvania Democrats
Philadelphia City Commissioners
Women in Pennsylvania politics
Yale University alumni
Courant Institute of Mathematical Sciences alumni
Haverford College faculty
Mathematicians from Philadelphia
20th-century American mathematicians
21st-century American mathematicians
American women mathematicians
20th-century American women
21st-century American women